This is a list of Academy of Country Music Awards ceremonies and the winners in each ceremony.

Ceremonies
Below is a list of ceremonies, the years the ceremonies were held, their hosts, the television networks that aired them, and their locations.

Awards by year
Below is a list of winners in the major categories by year. The year represents nominated work.

1960s

1966

1967

1968

1969

1970s

1970

1971

1972

1973

1974

1975

1976

1977

1978

1979

1980s

1980

1981

1982

1983

1984

1985

1986

1987

1988

1989

1990s

1990

1991

1992

1993

1994

1995

1996

1997

1998

1999

2000s

2000

2001

2002

2003

2004

2005

2006

2007

2008

2009

2010s

2010

2011

2012

2013

2014

2015

2016

2017

2018

2019

See also
List of Country Music Association Awards ceremonies

References

External links
Official site of the ACM Awards

American music awards
Music-related lists
Academy of Country Music Awards
Lists of award ceremonies